The Downtown Pawtucket Historic District encompasses a major portion of the central business district of Pawtucket, Rhode Island. The city's downtown was developed primarily between 1871 and 1930, covering the period when it grew to become the second-largest city in the state (behind neighboring Providence). The district is irregularly shaped, including properties on Montgomery Street south of Manchester, and properties on Exchange, North Union, and Summer streets between Broad and High Streets, as well as a few properties on Main Street and Maple Street east of Park Place. Most of the buildings are commercial in use, although there are three houses and a church included in the area.

The district was listed on the National Register of Historic Places in 2007.  Four buildings in the district were previously listed: the Elks Lodge Building, the Pawtucket Times Building, the Pawtucket Post Office, and the Deborah Cook Sayles Public Library.

See also
National Register of Historic Places listings in Pawtucket, Rhode Island

References

Queen Anne architecture in Rhode Island
Italianate architecture in Rhode Island
Historic districts in Providence County, Rhode Island
Historic districts on the National Register of Historic Places in Rhode Island
National Register of Historic Places in Pawtucket, Rhode Island